Timothy Chad Hansen (born January 18, 1995) is an American football wide receiver for the St. Louis BattleHawks of the XFL. He played college football for the California Golden Bears and was drafted by the New York Jets in the fourth round of the 2017 NFL Draft.

Early years
Hansen attended Moorpark High School in Moorpark, California. While there, he played high school football. As a senior, he had 49 receptions for 882 yards and 12 touchdowns.

College career
Hansen's lone scholarship offer to play college football was from Idaho State University. As a true freshman at Idaho State in 2013, he played in 11 games and had 45 receptions for 501 yards and three touchdowns. After the season, he transferred to the University of California, Berkeley, to join their team as a walk-on. After sitting out 2014, due to transfer rules, Hansen had 19 receptions for 249 yards and a touchdown over 10 games for the Golden Bears in 2015. As a junior in 2016, he was named first-team All-Pac-12 after recording 92 receptions for 1,249 yards and 11 touchdowns in 10 games. After the season, he decided to forgo his senior year and enter the 2017 NFL Draft.

Professional career

New York Jets 
Hansen was drafted by the New York Jets in the fourth round with the 141st overall pick in the 2017 NFL Draft.

He appeared in 15 games in his rookie season, recording 9 catches for 94 yards.

On September 1, 2018, Hansen was waived by the Jets.

New England Patriots 
On September 2, 2018, Hansen was claimed off waivers by the New England Patriots. He was waived on September 10, 2018.

Tennessee Titans
On October 2, 2018, Hansen was signed to the Tennessee Titans' practice squad. He was released on October 15, 2018.

Denver Broncos
On November 13, 2018, Hansen was signed to the Denver Broncos practice squad. On January 2, 2019, Hansen was re-signed to reserve/future contract. On May 2, 2019, the Broncos waived Hansen.

New Orleans Saints
On June 11, 2019, Hansen was signed by the New Orleans Saints. He was waived on July 25, 2019.

Houston Texans
On July 26, 2019, Hansen was claimed off waivers by the Houston Texans. The Texans waived him on August 31 during final roster cuts. On September 25, 2019, Hansen was signed to the practice squad. He signed a reserve/future contract with the Texans on January 13, 2020.

On September 5, 2020, Hansen was waived by the Texans and signed to the practice squad the next day. He was elevated to the active roster on December 5 and December 12 for the team's weeks 13 and 14 games against the Indianapolis Colts and Chicago Bears, and reverted to the practice squad after each game. He had five catches for 101 yards against the Colts. He was promoted to the active roster on December 19, 2020. He was released on March 23, 2021.

Detroit Lions
On June 18, 2021, Hansen signed with the Detroit Lions. He was waived on August 17, 2021.

Atlanta Falcons
On December 21, 2021, Hansen was signed to the Atlanta Falcons practice squad. He signed a reserve/future contract with the Falcons on January 10, 2022. He was waived on May 16, 2022.

DC Defenders
On January 25, 2023, Hansen was signed by the DC Defenders. He was released on February 22, 2023.

St. Louis BattleHawks
Hansen signed with the St. Louis BattleHawks of the XFL on March 8, 2023.

Personal life 
Hansen grew up in Fillmore, California, and attended Moorpark High School. His parents are Sheri and Tim Hansen and he has two younger sisters, Erika and Jules. He is engaged to Bryce Watts, whom he met while attending college at UC Berkeley.

References

External links
 Houston Texans bio
 California Golden Bears bio

1995 births
Living people
People from Fillmore, California
Players of American football from California
Sportspeople from Ventura County, California
American football wide receivers
California Golden Bears football players
Idaho State Bengals football players
New York Jets players
New England Patriots players
Tennessee Titans players
Denver Broncos players
New Orleans Saints players
Houston Texans players
Detroit Lions players
Atlanta Falcons players
DC Defenders players
St. Louis BattleHawks players